Erkan Veyseloğlu (born 13 March 1983) is a German-born Turkish professional basketball player who last played for Darüşşafaka of the Turkish Basketball Super League. Standing 6 ft 7 in (2.00 m), he plays the small forward position.

Early career
Born in 1983 in Munich, Germany, Veyseloğlu spent two years playing basketball for Antbirlik in Antalya, Turkey from 2000–2001.

Professional career
After playing his first three professional years from 2002–2004 for the Turkish Basketball League, Veyseloğlu submitted his name for the 2005 NBA Draft. After not being selected, he became an Unrestricted Free agent.

During the 2004–2005 Basketball Super League season with the Beşiktaş J.K. men's basketball team Veyseloğlu recorded an average of 6.2 points, 2.6 rebounds and 1.8 assists. While with Beşiktaş, he played games in the Basketball Champions League where he averaged 5.6 points and 2 rebounds.

He played on the Turkish national team at the EuroBasket 2017, averaging 4.3 points, 1.2 rebounds and 0.3 assists.

After eleven years Veyseloğlu returned to Beşiktaş in 2016, and played four seasons until 2019. 

In 2019 he signed with Darüşşafaka Basketbol.

References

External links
Eurobasket.com Profile
TBLStat.net Profile
Eurocup Profile

1983 births
Living people
Bandırma B.İ.K. players
Beşiktaş men's basketball players
Competitors at the 2009 Mediterranean Games
Darüşşafaka Basketbol players
Erdemirspor players
Fenerbahçe men's basketball players
Karşıyaka basketball players
Mediterranean Games bronze medalists for Turkey
Mediterranean Games medalists in basketball
Small forwards
Sportspeople from Munich
Tuborg Pilsener basketball players
Turkish men's basketball players
Türk Telekom B.K. players